Curtis Beach (born July 22, 1990) is an American decathlete who competed for Duke University. He formerly held high school records in the decathlon using three different implement standards: high school (7,909 points), international junior (7,599 points) and international senior (7,466 points). His performances in the high jump, 400 meters, and 1,500 meters were superior to those of U.S. Olympic gold medalist Bryan Clay in the 2008 Olympic Games. At the 2011 NCAA Men's Outdoor Track and Field Championship, as a freshman, Beach finished second overall in the decathlon. His 3:59.13 finish in the 1500 meter shattered the previous collegiate record and is the second-fastest 1500 meter in world history for a decathlon, just missing Robert Baker's mark from 1980.

High school career

In total, Beach won 17 individual New Mexico state titles in track and field events during his high school career at Albuquerque Academy.

At the National Scholastic Indoor Championships in New York, in March 2009, Beach reached 4127 points in the pentathlon, winning the championship and ranking #2 on the all-time list, trailing Donovan Kilmartin (4303 points).

At the 42nd Arcadia Invitational, in April 2009, Beach had a points total of 7,909 (with high school implements) in the decathlon to crush Ryan Thierault's record of 7417.

At the Great Southwest Classic in Albuquerque, in June 2009, Beach broke the high school record for decathlon with international implements (set by Craig Brigham in 1972) with 7466 to Brigham's 7359. Dyestat noted that "[Beach] ends all doubt—he is the greatest US high school decathlete ever."

College career

At the 2010 NCAA Indoor Championships, Beach finished in 12th place in the heptathlon with a score of 5,533 points.  Beach's 1000 m time of 2:27.88 was a world heptathlon best.  At the 2011 NCAA Men's Outdoor Track and Field Championship, as a freshman, Beach finished second overall in the decathlon. His 3:59.13 finish in the 1500 meter shattered the previous collegiate record and is the second-fastest 1500 meter in world history for a decathlon, just missing Robert Baker's mark from 1980.

Beach took first at the 2012 NCAA Indoor Track and Field Championships with 6,138 points and breaking his own previous world record in the heptathlon 1000m at 2:23.63

International career

At the 2007 World Youth Championships in Athletics, Beach placed 4th in the octathlon.

At the USA Junior Outdoor Track & Field Championships, Beach won the decathlon (against both high school athletes and college freshman) setting the junior, under age 20 record (with junior implements) accumulating 7599 points. He capped this victory off by winning the 1500 meters in 4:07.85 during windy conditions, a time that would have beaten the US senior 1500 meter decathlon winner by almost 15 seconds.

At the 2009 Pan American Junior Athletics Championships, Beach won the decathlon with a points total of 7377.

At the 2012 US Olympic Trials, Beach demonstrated commendable sportsmanship by slowing down and giving way to new decathlon world record holder Ashton Eaton in the final event, the 1500m.

Personal

Beach won the 2008-09 Gatorade National Boys Track & Field Athlete of the Year award.  As a result, the Governor of New Mexico declared July 1, 2009 "Curtis Beach Day," in New Mexico.

Beach was featured in Sports Illustrated in the Faces in the Crowd section.

References

External links

Duke Blue Devils bio

1990 births
Living people
Track and field athletes from Albuquerque, New Mexico
American male decathletes
Duke Blue Devils men's track and field athletes